Arctanthemum integrifolium, the entire-leaved daisy, is a subarctic species of plant in the sunflower family. It grows in Alaska, northern Canada, Peary Land in northern Greenland, and the East Chukotka region of eastern Russia.

Description 
Each plant usually produces only one flower head, blooming in the summer, containing 11–19 white ray flowers surrounding 60–80 yellow disc flowers.

Distribution and habitat 
This plant grows in alpine zones, found most typically on gravelly sites, arctic tundra, and exposed areas with low organic content, such as rock, sand, or gravel. It does not thrive in areas near the sea or where otherwise exposed to salt spray.

References

Plants described in 1823
Anthemideae
Flora of Quebec
Flora of North European Russia
Flora of Magadan Oblast
Flora of Alaska
Flora of the Northwest Territories
Flora of Nunavut
Flora of Yukon
Flora of British Columbia
Flora without expected TNC conservation status